The following is a list of notable deaths in October 2001.

Entries for each day are listed alphabetically by surname. A typical entry lists information in the following sequence:
 Name, age, country of citizenship at birth, subsequent country of citizenship (if applicable), reason for notability, cause of death (if known), and reference.

October 2001

1
Guy Beaulne, 79, French-Canadian actor and theatre director.
Anna McClean Bidder, 98, British zoologist and academic.
Surendranath Dwivedy, 88, Indian politician, journalist and social worker.
Kenny Greene, 32, American singer-songwriter, AIDS.
Gregory Hemingway, 69, American physician and son of Ernest Hemingway, hypertension and cardiovascular disease.
Leroy Snyder, 70, American serial killer.
Mickey Trotman, 26, Trinidad and Tobago football player, car crash.

2
Manny Albam, 79, American jazz baritone saxophone player, composer, arranger and producer.
Pat Ast, 59, American actress and model.
Franz Biebl, 95, German classical music composer.
Donald J. Cohen, 61, American psychiatrist and psychoanalyst, melanoma.
Fernando Mendes, 55, Portuguese cyclist.
Tommy McCulloch, 79, Scottish footballer.
Seymour Milstein, 81, American real estate developer and philanthropist.

3
Alfie Almario, 38, Filipino basketball player, heart attack.
Ricky Belmonte, 54, Filipino actor, cerebral hemorrhage caused by a stroke.
Homer Elias, 46, American gridiron football player (Detroit Lions).
Alessandro Fersen, 89, Polish-Italian dramatist, actor, and theater director.
Philip Goldson, 78, Belizean newspaper editor, activist and politician.
Paul E. Ison, 84, United States Marine Corps infantryman during World War II.
Barin Mazumder, 79, Bangladeshi classical musician.
Gregorio Peralta, 66, Argentine boxer.
Jean Rankin, 96, Scottish naturalist and courtier.

4
Blaise Alexander, 25, American race car driver, race crash.
Patsy Burt, 73, British racing driver.
George Claydon, 68, British actor and mascot of the England Football Team in 1966.
John Collins, 88, American jazz guitarist.
Arthur Daniels, 79, Welsh rugby league player.
Al Ham, 76, American composer and jingle writer.
Gerd Larsen, 80, Norwegian ballerina.
Ahron Soloveichik, 84, American Torah scholar and rabbi.

5
América Barrios, 84, Cuban actress.
Peter Burge, 69, Australian cricketer.
Clyde L. Choate, 81, American politician from Southern Illinois and decorated soldier.
Brian Edgar, 65, British rugby league player.
Fereydoon Forooghi, 50, Iranian singer, musician and composer, heart attack.
Woody Jensen, 94, American baseball player.
Jan Lenica, 73, Polish graphic designer and cartoonist.
Mike Mansfield, 98, American politician and diplomat (U.S. Representative from Montana, U.S. Senator from Montana, Senate Majority Leader).
Egbert van 't Oever, 74, Dutch speed skater, colon cancer.
Emilie Schindler, 93, German wife of  Oskar Schindler who helped save the lives of 1,200 Jews during World War II.
Robert Stevens, 63, American photo editor and anthrax attack victim.

6
Axel Düberg, 73, Swedish film actor.
Arne Harris, 67, American television producer-director (WGN-TV broadcasts of Chicago Cubs).
Yuriy Meshcheryakov, 55, Soviet/Ukrainian animator.
Milton A. Rothman, 81, American nuclear physicist, complications due to diabetes.
Miguel del Toro, 29, Mexican baseball player.

7
Christopher Adams, 46, English wrestler and judoka, brother of Olympic Judo star Neil Adams, shot.
Gaby Basset, 99, French film actress.
Alf Gover, 93, English test cricketer.
Herblock, 91, American editorial cartoonist (The Washington Post).
Stewart Imlach, 69, Scottish football player.
Jimmie Logsdon, 79, American country and rockabilly singer, songwriter and radio DJ.
Polly Rowles, 87, American actress (The Defenders, Sweet Liberty, Power).

8
Leonora Arye, American sculptor and writer.
Ross T. Dwyer, 82, United States Marine Corps major general.
Kenneth L. Hale, 67, American linguist, known for study and preservation of endangered aboriginal languages.
Caryl Parker Haskins, 93, American scientist, author, inventor, philanthropist, and entomologist
Seymour Heller, 87, American talent agent and manager (represented Liberace).
Javed Iqbal, 45, Pakistani serial killer.
Sankaradi, 77, Indian actor.

9
Roberto Campos, 84, Brazilian economist, writer, diplomat, and politician, heart attack.
Dagmar, 79, American actress, model, and television personality.
Norris Houghton, 91, American theatre manager and producer.
Herbert Ross, 74, American stage choreographer, and film director and producer (Funny Lady, The Turning Point).
William A. Ryan, 82, American politician.
Károly Simonyi, 84, Hungarian physicist and writer.

10
Eddie Futch, 90, American boxing trainer (Joe Frazier, Ken Norton, Larry Holmes, Trevor Berbick).
Luis Antonio García Navarro, 60, Spanish conductor (Music Director of the Teatro Real).
Cal Gardner, 76, Canadian professional ice hockey player (New York Rangers, Toronto Maple Leafs, Chicago Black Hawks, Boston Bruins).
Dave Gerard, 65, American baseball player.
Vasily Mishin, 84, Soviet rocket designer.
Samuel Ndhlovu, 64, Zambian footballer and coach.
Bérangère Vattier, 60, French comedian, cancer.

11
Franco Committeri, 77, Italian film producer.
Tommy Harris, 76, English footballer.
Nada Mamula, 74, Yugoslavian singer.
Beni Montresor, 75, Italian artist, illustrator and set designer.
Thomas C. Wales, 49, American  prosecutor and gun control advocate, murdered.

12
Richard Buckle, 85, British ballet critic.
Ruth Goetz, 89, American playwright (The Heiress) and screenwriter.
Lord Hailsham of St Marylebone, (Quintin Hogg), 94, British lawyer and politician.
John T. Robinson, 78, South African palaeontologist.
Hikmet Şimşek, Turkish orchestra conductor.
Otis Young, 69, American actor (The Outcasts, The Last Detail).

13
Peter Doyle, 52, Australian pop singer (The New Seekers).
Ubi Dwyer, 68, Irish anarchist.
Fritz Fromm, 88, German Olympic field handball player (gold medal winner of the men's team handball competition at the 1936 Summer Olympics).
B. L. Graham, 87, American college basketball player and coach (Ole Miss).
Glenn Johnson, 79, American professional football player (New York Yankees, Green Bay Packers, Winnipeg Blue Bombers).
David Neil MacKenzie, 75, British linguist.
Pal Mirashi, 75, Albanian football player.
Olga Oleinik, 76, Soviet/Russian mathematician.

14
Sir Philip Adams, 85, British diplomat.
Willam Christensen, 99, American ballet dancer, choreographer and founder of the San Francisco Ballet and Ballet West in Salt Lake City, Utah.
Eugene Grebenik, 82, British academic and demographer.
Vernon Harrison, 89, British photographer and parapsychologist.
David Lewis, 60, American philosopher.
Ben Sankey, 94, American baseball player.
Sergei Stvolov, 37, Soviet/Russian military officer, car accident.

15
Jamie Cann, 55, British Labour Party politician, liver disease.
Chang Hsueh-liang, 100, Chinese warlord and military figure.
Justus Cornelias Dirks, 90, South African author.
Ralph Levy, 80, American producer, film and television director.
Anne Ridler, 89, British poet and editor.
Janet Shaw, 82, American actress, Alzheimer's disease

16
Gotthold Gloger, 77, German writer and painter.
Etta Jones, 72, American jazz singer, cancer.
Yuri Ozerov, 80, Soviet film director and screenwriter.

17
Frank Anscombe, 83, English statistician.
Cornelius Casey, 72, Irish-American football player.
Jay Livingston, 86, American composer (Academy Award for Best Original Song for "Buttons and Bows", "Mona Lisa" and "Que Sera, Sera").
Micheline Ostermeyer, 78, French Olympic champion at the 1948 Summer Olympics and concert pianist.
Jack Smith, 77, American NASCAR driver, congestive heart failure.
Neil Tillotson, 102, American inventor.
Rehavam Ze'evi, 75, Israeli army general and politician.

18
Paul J. Bailey, 79, American jockey in thoroughbred racing, brain tumor.
Ferris Fain, 80, American baseball player, complications from leukemia and diabetes.
János Kulka, 80, Hungarian conductor and composer.
Ray Lovejoy, 62, British film editor (2001: A Space Odyssey, The Shining, Aliens), heart attack.
Dan Nugent, 48, American gridiron football player (Washington Redskins), leukemia.
Rambeer Singh Tomar, 31, Indian Army Non Commissioned Officer, K.I.A.
A. T. Ummer, 68, Indian music composer.

19
Kay Dick, 86, English journalist, novelist and autobiographer.
Woody Dumart, 84, Canadian ice hockey player (Boston Bruins).
Leslie Johnston, 81, Scottish football player.
Jagernath Lachmon, 85, Surinamese politician.
Hugh Mulcahy, 88, American baseball player.
Joe Murray, 80, American baseball player.

20
Marko Hirsma, 36, Finnish musician, outlaw biker and gangster, shot.
Frank Hodgkinson, 82, Australian painter and graphic artist.
Patricia Locke, 73, Native American educator-activist, heart-failure.
Kaviyoor Murali, Indian activist.
Nebojša Popović, 78, Serbian basketball player and coach.
John H. Terry, 76, American lawyer and politician.
Andrew Waterhouse, 42, English poet and musician, suicide.

21
George Feyer, 92, Hungarian-American cafe pianist and entertainer.
Margaret Hope MacPherson, 93, Scottish crofter, politician, author, and activist.
Paul Mickelson, 73, American organist, arranger, and record label executive, heart attack.
Sir John Plumb, 90, British historian.
David Lowell Rich, 81, American film director and producer.

22
Howard Finster, 84, American artist and baptist minister.
Ernest Hilgard, 97, American psychologist and professor at Stanford University.
Samuel Khachikian, 78, Iranian film director, author, and film editor.
Norman Lessing, 90, American television screenwriter and producer, playwright, and chess master.
Jan Glastra van Loon, 81, Dutch politician.
Bertie Mee, 82, English footballer.
Ramakrishna, 62, Indian actor.
Ed Vijent, 38, Dutch football player, stabbed.
Georgy Vitsin, 84, Soviet/Russian actor.
Diana Van der Vlis, 66, Canadian-American actress, cardiac arrest.

23
Ken Aston, 86, British football referee.
Marian Fischman, 62, American psychologist, complications from colon cancer.
Josh Kirby, 72, British artist.
Sylvester Perry Ryan, 83, Canadian lawyer and politician.
Linden Travers, 88, British actress (The Lady Vanishes, No Orchids for Miss Blandish).
Daniel Wildenstein, 84, French art dealer, historian and owner-breeder of thoroughbred race horses.

24
Kathleen Ankers, 82, American theatrical and television set and costume designer (Late Night with David Letterman, The Rosie O'Donnell Show).
Kim Gardner, 53, English musician (Badger, Ashton, Gardner & Dyke, The Birds, The Creation).
Eugenio Granell, 88, Spanish painter (often described as "the last Spanish surrealist painter").
Jaromil Jireš, 65, Czechoslovak filmmaker.
Eamon Kelly, 87, Irish actor.
Bill Mueller, 80, American baseball player.
Seishiro Shimatani, 62, Japanese football player and manager, cirrhosis.
Stephen Wurm, 79, Hungarian-Australian linguist.

25
Jack Blackwell, 91, English footballer.
Marvin Harris, 74, American anthropologist.
Yoritsune Matsudaira, 94,  Japanese composer.
René Philombé, 70, Cameroonian writer, journalist, poet, and playwright.
Alan Pultz, 64, American television director.

26
Larry Aldrich, 95, American fashion designer and art collector.
Soraya Esfandiary-Bakhtiary, 69, queen consort of Iran as wife of Shah Mohammad Reza Pahlavi.
Charlie van Gelderen, 88, South African journalist and Trotskyist, and the last surviving participant of Leon Trotsky's 4th International in 1938.
Laszlo Halasz, 96, Hungarian-American music director (New York City Opera).
Abdul Haq, 43, Afghan mujahideen commander, executed by the Taliban.
Eugene Jackson, 84, American child actor (Our Gang, The Big Town, Shootin' Injuns, Little Annie Rooney, The Addams Family).
Elizabeth Jennings, 75, English poet.
Maya Kamath, 50, Indian cartoonist.
Kris Kovick, 50, California-based writer, cartoonist, and printer, breast cancer.
Olga Lehmann, 89, Chilean-British visual artist.
John Platts-Mills, 95, British politician and lawyer.
Richard Seifert, 90, Swiss-British architect.
Gerald Solomon, 71, American businessman and politician.
Barbara Tropp, 53, American orientalist, chef, and food writer, ovarian cancer.
Audrey Withers, 96, English journalist.

27
Fr. Abel, 81, Indian Catholic CMI priest, cardiac arrest.
Maragatham Chandrasekar, 84, Indian politician and Member of Parliament.
Seán Condon, 78, Irish hurler.
Dirk Willem van Krevelen, 86, Dutch chemical engineer.
Pradeep Kumar, 76, Indian actor.
John P. Roberts, 56, American businessman, promoter of the Woodstock Festival.

28
Fulvio Balatti, 63, Italian rower.
Richard Halsey Best, 91, United States Navy dive bomber pilot during World War II.
Grigory Chukhray, 80, Soviet/Russian film director and screenwriter, heart failure.
Jallouli Fares, 92, Tunisian politician.
Gerard Hengeveld, 90, Dutch pianist, composer and educator.
Hans Hohenester, 84, German Olympic bobsledder (two-man bobsleigh at the 1956 Winter Olympics).
Leonard Melfi, 69, American playwright and actor, congestive heart failure.
Sir John Mogg, 88, British army general.

29
Maura Fay, 43, Australian casting director.
Angelo Ippolito, 78, Italian-American painter (Museum of Modern Art, Whitney Museum of American Art, Metropolitan Museum of Art).
Freddie Silva, 63, Sri Lankan actor, singer.
K. P. Ummer, 67, Indian film actor.

30
John W. Atherton, 85, American poet and professor.
Marga Legal, 93, German actress.
Johnny Lucadello, 82, American baseball player.
Maurice Miller, 81, British politician.
Jack Scott, 85, New Zealand politician.
William R. Smallwood, 73, Canadian politician.

31
Colin Campbell, 59, Canadian video artist.
Régine Cavagnoud, 31, French Olympic and World Cup alpine ski racer (2001 World Champion in Super G).
Warren Elliot Henry, 92, American physicist, made significant contributions to radar technology and the physical properties of materials.
Jenny Laird, 89, British actress.
Angus MacVicar, 93, British author.
Braj Kumar Nehru, 90, Indian diplomat and ambassador.
Bill Le Sage, 74, British musician.
Art Wall Jr., 77, American professional golfer (1959 winner of the Masters Tournament).
Paul Warnke, 81, American diplomat.

References 

2001-10
 10